USS Frank Cable (AS-40) is the second  built by the Lockheed Shipbuilding and Construction Company of Seattle, Washington for the United States Navy.

The ship was christened on 14 January 1978 by Mrs. Rose A. Michaelis, wife of Admiral Frederick H. Michaelis, then Chief of Naval Material.

History

USS Frank Cable was designed as a submarine tender for s. The ship spent 1980 until 1996 as the repair ship for SUBRON 4 and 18 in Charleston, South Carolina, tending  and s. Frank Cable began decommissioning in 1996, but then was reactivated and refitted to replace  in the Western Pacific as Commander Seventh Fleet's mobile repair and support platform.

Since arriving in Guam, USS Frank Cable has visited many Western Pacific ports to support U.S. military forces. In 1997, the ship was heavily involved with the rescue and recovery efforts following the Korean Air Flight 801 crash on Guam, and also in the recovery and clean-up efforts following Typhoon Paka. From 1980 to 2003, USS Frank Cable garnered many awards as a unit of both the U.S. Atlantic and Pacific Fleets, including seven Meritorious Unit Commendations, nine Battle Efficiency "E" awards and three Golden Anchor Awards. Frank Cable'''s most recent recognition was a Humanitarian Service Medal for support provided in recovery efforts on Guam following Super Typhoon Pongsona in 2002.

USS Frank Cable is most recently known for a sailor, MMA2 Slicer who saved a baby in 2017.

USS Frank Cable held a wreath-laying ceremony after departing Jakarta on 25 July 2022 to honor the 53 Indonesian Sailors who lost their lives aboard the KRI Nanggala which sunk on 21 April 2021 off the coast of Bali.
Accidents
On 1 December 2006, a steam line ruptured aboard USS Frank Cable''. Two sailors were killed and six others injured.

Awards
 Navy Meritorious Unit Commendation - (Jan 1985 – Sep 1986, Aug 1989 – Feb 1991, Jan 1993 – Mar 1985, Apr 1995 – Apr 1997, Jan 1997 – Jan 1998, Jul 1999 – Jul 2001, Aug 2001 – Jul 2003, Jul 2002 – Jan 2003, Aug 2003 – Jul 2005, Nov 2011 – Oct 2012)
 Battle "E" - (1986, 1989, 1996, 1998, 1999, 2001, 2002, 2008, 2009, 2010, 2011, 2014, 2015, 2016, 2020, 2021)
 Humanitarian Service Medal - (8-31 Dec 2002) Typhoon Pongsona
 SECNAV Safety Excellence Award - (2016, 2017)
 SECNAV Environmental Stewardship Award - (2017)

References

External links

 
 navsource.org: USS Frank Cable

 

1978 ships
Auxiliary ships of the United States
Emory S. Land-class submarine tenders
Ships built by Lockheed Shipbuilding and Construction Company
Submarine tenders of the United States Navy
Submarine tenders